Massereene Lower is a barony in County Antrim, Northern Ireland. To its west lies Lough Neagh, and it is bordered by four other baronies: Massereene Upper to the south; Belfast Upper to the east; Antrim Upper to the north; and Toome Upper to the north-west.

List of settlements
Below is a list of settlements in Massereene Lower:

Towns
Muckamore

Population centres
Aldergrove
Diamond
Killead
Loanends
Nutt's Corner

List of civil parishes
Below is a list of civil parishes in Massereene Lower:
Grange of Muckamore
Killead

Archaeology
The barony contains the largest concentration of ringforts in Ireland, with three ringforts per square kilometre.

References

 
Archaeological sites in County Antrim
Clandeboye